Point Park University is a private university in Pittsburgh, Pennsylvania. Formerly known as Point Park College, the school name was revised in 2004 to reflect the number of graduate programs being offered.

History

Beginnings
The university began in 1933 as a one-room business school called Business Training College with an initial enrollment of 50 students, under the direction of Dorothy Finkelhor, a New York native, and her husband, L. Herbert Finkelhor. At the time, it was notable for a woman to found such an institution. Finkelhor provided her students with business and secretarial skills. At the same time, she served in multiple roles as teacher, the dean of women, social chairman, janitor, telephone operator, admissions and finance director, and registrar.

Becoming a college

By 1960, the business school had grown to nearly 880 students and moved to the university's current academic center, Academic Hall, on Wood Street in central Downtown Pittsburgh. The Finkelhors' small secretarial school became Point Park Junior College, named for the city's historic Point State Park. The junior college added two-year programs in engineering technology, education and journalism. It also acquired performing arts space at The Pittsburgh Playhouse in the Oakland neighborhood. Five years later, the college was granted four-year status, officially becoming Point Park College. Dance and theatre programs were introduced. These programs laid the groundwork for Point Park's current Conservatory of Performing Arts.

Thirty-four years after forming the college, Dorothy Finkelhor retired in 1967. The school's reins remained within the family as son-in-law Arthur M. Blum assumed the presidency. Blum purchased the Sherwyn Hotel, a 20-story building across from Academic Hall, which became David L. Lawrence Hall. The hall currently contains most of the school's social and entertaining facilities, as well as classrooms, offices and residential facilities.

Blum's Lawrence Hall investment continues to benefit the school. Blum also established a campus in Lugano, Switzerland. A gift from Lester Hamburg brought the school a conference center in Portersville, Pennsylvania.

In the early 1970s, John V. Hopkins succeeded Blum, and in time enrollment grew beyond 1,000 students. Eventually, the school introduced its first postgraduate degree, a master's degree in journalism and mass communication.

J. Matthew Simon became as the college's next president in 1986, overseeing the acquisition of a new library, program growth and the school's largest endowment. Simon retired in 2007, having taught at Point Park as a professor in the Department of Natural Sciences and Engineering Technology after his tenure as president.

A crisis came with the election of James Hunter as president in the mid-1990s. Hunter, Point Park's most controversial leader, served for a little over a year but managed to garner outcry for an admissions scandal and a breakdown of communication within the school.

At the same time, growth remained slow in the city, and Pittsburgh's economy still had not recovered from the collapse of the steel industry. The college's finances suffered, and Point Park again neared bankruptcy. Negotiations began with Duquesne University to sell what remained of Point Park College to the larger school.

Hunter resigned amidst the melee, and Katherine Henderson was appointed president by the board of trustees soon after.

Growth and change
Henderson implemented a strategic plan to revive the college. Plans to sell the school were abandoned as Henderson began another procedural overhaul.

Henderson's tenure became the most successful for Point Park. During the late 1990s, budget woes disintegrated as enrollment rose to over 3,000 students and the endowment grew by over 200 percent. Point Park finished major renovations of its existing buildings soon after the turn of the century.

By 2004, the college was officially renamed Point Park University and the administration began an aggressive $1 million branding campaign to attract more enrollment. Two years later, Henderson retired while on a self-imposed sabbatical.

The board of trustees officially named Paul Hennigan as Henderson's permanent successor at the beginning of the 2006 fall term. Hennigan has continued the process of creating a new strategic plan. As part of the plan, the university has purchased several Downtown properties for development. Point Park is also poised to become a key player in the city's efforts for Downtown revitalization, owning properties along the coveted Fifth and Forbes corridor.

A $16 million  state-of-the-art dance complex opened in 2007. The complex includes five rehearsal and performance studios, and recently received Gold LEED certification from the U.S. Green Building Council. Located in the heart of Downtown Pittsburgh, the complex is home to the George Rowland White Performance Studio, a 188-seat convertible performance space.

Point Park purchased the building occupied by the YMCA of Greater Pittsburgh on the Boulevard of the Allies in the spring of 2008. In September 2010, the newly renovated former YMCA building reopened as the interim Student Center with exercise and fitness facilities and equipment, a gymnasium, meeting space and much more.

In 2015, the university began creating a "New Academic Village" that will make the school, and downtown, a vibrant area for students. With the introduction of this initiative, Point Park has evolved into one of the largest investors in Downtown Pittsburgh real estate development. The following year, Point Park University added a new center for journalism at the former location of Nathan's Famous hot dogs.

In the Fall of 2018, a coffee shop opened on campus and named Point Perk in a student naming contest. This new coffee shop came after the Starbucks that was previously on campus closed its doors in 2017. While the new coffee shop is not an official corporate Starbucks, it is considered a "We Proudly Brew" location, giving campus food provider CulinArt full control over menu items while still serving Starbucks beverages.

Academics
Point Park University offers more than 90 undergraduate and graduate degree programs, and is divided into five schools: School of Arts & Sciences, School of Business, School of Communication, School of Education, and Conservatory of Performing Arts.

Campus

Point Park is situated about half a mile from Point State Park, the university's namesake, in the city's Golden Triangle. The school is in the midst of the business district, near both PPG Place (one of the most recognizable buildings in the city’s skyline) and the relatively new LEED Platinum Certified headquarters of PNC Financial Services. The physical campus is mostly vertical, with buildings scattered among non-school structures. Point Park owns the Pittsburgh Playhouse in the Oakland neighborhood, but has replaced it with a new complex in downtown Pittsburgh; demolition of Oakland's Pittsburgh Playhouse was scheduled to start in June 2019. Since the campus is not contiguous, the school used the phrase "Pittsburgh is our campus" in its literature.

Because of its downtown locale, the school is within walking distance of the Cultural District and the city's sports facilities, PNC Park, PPG Paints Arena, and Heinz Field. It is also close to Pittsburgh's major nightlife areas on the Southside, in Station Square, and in the Strip District. Nearly 1,000 full-time undergraduate students live on campus. The majority of Point Park students commute to campus.

With 15 buildings and other properties that run from the Monongahela River to Forbes Avenue, the university has one of the largest footprints in downtown Pittsburgh.

Department of Public Safety
The Campus is covered by the Point Park University Department of Public Safety, a campus police agency which provides patrol and crime prevention services to the university. Point Park University was cited in 2017 as having the highest campus crime rate per student in Pittsburgh. The department, and in particular the Police Division, have been recognized for innovation in campus law enforcement, for example having become the first campus police agency in Pennsylvania to issue body-worn cameras to officers, and the creation of an anonymous tip app.

The executive of the Point Park University Department of Public Safety is the Assistant Vice President of Public Safety and Chief of Police, currently Jeff Besong, and is appointed by Point Park University. The department consists of two divisions: The Police Division provides patrol and crime scene interaction, while the Public Safety Division provides dispatch and security monitoring services. The Police Division was established in 2011 with five officers, and was initially limited to bike and foot patrol, and became accredited by the Pennsylvania Chiefs of Police Association in March 2013.

Student life

Student government 
The Student Government Association (SGA), formerly known as the United Student Government (USG) is the representative student government of Point Park University. SGA comprises two entities, the Executive Cabinet and the Legislative Body.

WPPJ
WPPJ (670 AM) is Point Park University's campus radio station. This unlicensed carrier-current station was established in 1967 and is known as "The Voice of Point Park". It is a co-curricular activity for students with an interest in radio, news, sports, contemporary/popular music, media sales and promotions. WPPJ also serves as a training facility for students of any major who desire a career in professional broadcasting. The station is an open-format college radio station, playing primarily indie rock and hip-hop, with a fair number of sports and talk radio shows. The music department charts independent artists with CMJ.

Athletics
The Point Park athletic teams are called the Pioneers. The university is a member of the National Association of Intercollegiate Athletics (NAIA), primarily competing in the River States Conference (RSC; formerly known as the Kentucky Intercollegiate Athletic Conference (KIAC) until after the 2015–16 school year) since the 2012–13 academic year. The Pioneers previously competed in the defunct American Mideast Conference from 1999–2000 to 2011–12 (when the conference dissolved).

Point Park competes in 16 intercollegiate varsity sports: Men's sports include baseball, basketball, cross country, golf, soccer and track & field; while women's sports include basketball, cross country, golf, soccer, softball, track & field and volleyball; and co-ed sports include competitive cheer, competitive dance and eSports. Baseball is the dominant sport of the university, bringing home the most championships.

Pioneers logo
The Point Park Pioneers logo prominently displays the school name as well as the nickname for the sports teams – Pioneers. A central figure is the bison, which has long been a mascot for the school. The bison was first used as a school mascot in the 1967–68 school year, the first year of intercollegiate competition versus four-year institutions.

The bison became a mascot for the school in 1967 when the Alpha Phi Omega fraternity teamed with the Varsity Club to acquire a live bison. The bison was named Black Diamond II in reference to the Black Diamond bison on the reverse side of the U.S. nickel at the time. It was kept at South Park and was a featured attraction at parades on the Boulevard of the Allies as well as at sporting events.

Black Diamond II was widely popular at Point Park and was a source of pride for the entire school. Although Black Diamond II eventually died, it remains a fixture at the school at present day.

Also prominently displayed is the Downtown Pittsburgh environment of which Point Park is a part. In the back left are iconic pieces of the Pittsburgh skyline, and in the back right are two central pieces to the Point Park campus – Lawrence Hall and Academic Hall. Included is the pedestrian bridge above Wood Street that connects the two Point Park buildings. The shape at the bottom of the logo is representative of the bastions of Fort Duquesne and Fort Pitt, which were once located in the area now known as Point State Park. Point Park University derives its name from Point State Park, which is located at the meeting place of the Allegheny and Monongahela rivers. Point State Park is just a few blocks from the university's campus.

The head men's basketball coach is Joe Lewandowski. The head coach of the women's basketball team is Tony Grenek.

Notable alumni

 John Amplas – Film actor, known for Dawn of the Dead, Knightriders, Creepshow, and Day of the Dead
 Rob Ashford – Won the Tony Award in 2002 for his choreography for Broadway's Thoroughly Modern Millie
 Panther Bior – One of the Lost Boys of Sudan, featured in the award-winning documentary film God Grew Tired of Us
 Greg Brown – Pittsburgh Pirates broadcaster
 Gerald M. Feierstein – U.S. ambassador
 Paul Costa – Member of the Pennsylvania House of Representatives
 Jennifer DiNoia – Theatre actress
 Billy Hartung – Broadway/TV actor and dancer, played Chuck Cranston in Footloose and appeared in the 2002 film Chicago
 Neil Haskell – Broadway performer and contemporary dancer, So You Think You Can Dance contestant
 Michael Holley – Sports journalist
 Melina Kanakaredes – TV actress and Daytime Emmy Award nominee
 Don Kelly – MLB Shortstop
 Alicia Kozakiewicz, Television Personality and child Internet safety advocate
 Bobby Madritsch – MLB Pitcher
 John Magaro – Film actor
 Jim Martin – Emmy Award-winning director for Sesame Street
 Dennis Miller – Comedian
 Jimmy Miller – Film producer, credits include She's Out Of My League, Step Brothers, and The Other Guys
 Matthew Noszka – Model
 Gino Anthony Pesi – Actor, producer, director, and writer, known for his role on Shades of Blue
 Megan Sikora – Broadway performer & Dancer, appeared as Lorraine/Ensemble in 42nd Street
 Ryan Skyy – Six-time #1 Billboard-charting music producer, DJ, and radio host
 Paige Spara – Actress known for her work in The Good Doctor and Kevin from Work
 John Stuper – MLB Pitcher
 Tony Yazbeck – Broadway performer, Billy Flynn in Chicago
 Marisha Ray – Voice actor, known for Critical Role
 Fred McLeod – Sportscaster
 Josh Haeder – 33rd State Treasurer of South Dakota

International Summer Dance alumni
 Josefina Scaglione – Broadway actress and dancer
 Stephen Hanna – Former principal dancer for NYC Ballet and Broadway dancer

References

External links

 
 Official athletics website

 
Educational institutions established in 1960
Dance in Pennsylvania
Performing arts education in the United States
Universities and colleges in Pittsburgh
1960 establishments in Pennsylvania
Private universities and colleges in Pennsylvania